The 2010 National Football Challenge Cup was the 20th edition of National Football Challenge Cup, the main cup competition in Pakistani football. The tournament was held in Multan.

A total of 16 were participating in the tournament, but Karachi Port Trust withdrew few days before the start of tournaments.

Khan Research Laboratories were the defending champions, winning the previous edition defeating Pakistan Airforce in the finals.

Khan Research Laboratories successfully defended the title, as they went on to defeat Pakistan Navy 4–0 in the finals.

Group stage

Group A

Group B

Group C

Group D

Knockout round

Quarter-finals

Semi-finals

Third-place match

Final

Pakistan National Football Challenge Cup
Cup